Blue Jay Creek or Bluejay Creek may refer to:

Blue Jay Creek (Lake Huron tributary), a stream in Ontario, Canada
Bluejay Creek (Pic River tributary), a stream in Ontario, Canada
Blue Jay Creek (Michigan), a stream in the United States